26074 Carlwirtz, provisional designation , is a dynamical Hungaria asteroid and binary Mars-crosser from the innermost regions of the asteroid belt, approximately  in diameter. It was discovered on 8 October 1977, by German astronomer Hans-Emil Schuster at ESO's La Silla Observatory in northern Chile. The likely binary asteroid on a relatively circular orbit has a short rotation period of 2.5 hours. It was named for German astronomer Carl Wilhelm Wirtz. The system's suspected minor-planet moon of unknown size was first detected in 2013.

Orbit and classification 

Carlwirtz is a member of the Mars-crossing asteroids, a dynamically unstable group between the main belt and the near-Earth populations, crossing the orbit of Mars at 1.66 AU. It also belongs to the dynamical Hungaria group, which forms the innermost dense concentration of asteroids in the Solar System. It is, however, not a member of the Hungaria family, but a non-family asteroid of the main belt's background population when applying the hierarchical clustering method to its proper orbital elements.

It orbits the Sun in the innermost asteroid belt at a distance of 1.65–1.97 AU once every 2 years and 5 months (890 days; semi-major axis of 1.81 AU). Its orbit has an unusually low eccentricity of 0.09 and an inclination of 32° with respect to the ecliptic. The body's observation arc begins at La Silla Observatory in October 1977, on the night following its official discovery observation.

Naming 

This minor planet was named after Carl Wilhelm Wirtz (1875–1939), a German astronomer at Strasbourg and Kiel observatories. In 1924, he revealed statistically the redshift-distance relationship of spiral nebulae. The official  was published by the Minor Planet Center on 28 September 2004.

Physical characteristics 

Carlwirtz is an assumed E-type asteroid, but may as well be a common S-type asteroid, since the E-type is typical found among members of the Hungaria family rather than among the larger, encompassing dynamical group with the same name.

Rotation period 

In June 2013, a rotational lightcurve of Carlwirtz was obtained from photometric observations by American photometrist Brian Warner at the Palmer Divide Station  in California. Lightcurve analysis gave a well-defined rotation period of  hours with a brightness amplitude of  magnitude. Follow-up observations by Warner in May 2018 gave a similar period  hours.

Satellite 

During the observations in June 2013, Warner also noted that Carlwirtz is likely a synchronous binary asteroid with a minor-planet moon in its orbit. While the satellite dimension could not be determined, it has an orbital period of 16.11 hours with an estimated semi-major axis of 6.1 kilometers. However, neither in 2013 nor in the 2018-observations any eclipsing/occultation events could be detected. Instead the asteroid has a classically shaped bimodal lightcurve instead. Since Carlwirtz has a period that is close to two thirds of an Earth-day, single-station observations have difficulties to track a complete lightcurve.

Diameter and albedo 

The Collaborative Asteroid Lightcurve Link assumes an albedo of 0.30 – a compromise value between the S-type (0.20) and E-type (0.40) asteroids – and calculates a diameter of 2.54 kilometers based on an absolute magnitude of 14.9. According to estimates by Johnston's archive, Carlwirtz measures 3.62 kilometers in diameter for an assumed albedo of 0.16.

Notes

References

External links 
 Asteroids with Satellites, Robert Johnston, johnstonsarchive.net
 Asteroid Lightcurve Database (LCDB), query form (info )
 Dictionary of Minor Planet Names, Google books
 Discovery Circumstances: Numbered Minor Planets (25001)-(30000) – Minor Planet Center
 
 

026074
026074
Discoveries by Hans-Emil Schuster
Named minor planets
026074
19771008